Malcom Ollie "Mal" Couch, Jr. (July 12, 1938, Dallas, Texas, USA – February 12, 2013) was the founder and first president of the Tyndale Theological Seminary. He was a pastor, an author of many books, and writer of 40 documentaries on Bible prophecies and biblical issues. While president of Tyndale Theological Seminary Couch recruited some very well known scholars and Bible teachers to teach the student body. Dr. Norman Geisler, Dr. Paige Patterson, Dr. Robert Lightner, Dr. Arnold G. Fruchtenbaum, and Paul Enns were used in the educational endeavors at Tyndale Seminary. After Dr. Couch retired from Tyndale Seminary he became a Vice President of the Scofield Graduate School and Seminary located in Modesto, California.

Couch was part of the Pre-Trib Study Research Group that was founded by Tim LaHaye and Thomas Ice. He was also a member of Tyndale Seminary's Conservative Theological Society.

Education of Mal Couch 
Couch earned several degrees. He earned his Bachelor of Arts degree from John Brown University. Then he earned a Master of Arts from Wheaton College. From there he earned his Masters of Theology degree from Dallas Theological Seminary. While there Couch studied under some of the famous Dallas Dispensationalists like John Walvoord, Charles C. Ryrie, and J.D. Pentecost. He also earned a Doctor of Theology degree from Louisiana Baptist University. He also earned two additional degrees beyond his Th.D. with a D.D. and Philosophy Doctorate from Arkansas Biblical Graduate School.

As a teacher, he taught at various colleges and seminaries throughout his career. He taught at Philadelphia College of the Bible (Now CAIRN University), Moody Bible Institute, and Dallas Theological Seminary. He founded Tyndale Theological Seminary and led as its president until his retirement. He then served as Vice President of Scofield Theological Seminary as he worked with various students he mentored through various academic degrees.

Theology of Mal Couch 
Dr. Couch held to the full inspiration and inerrancy of Scripture. He wrote "God Has Spoken: Inspiration and Inerrancy" to express this conviction. Couch affirmed an epistemological foundation that shows that the ultimate authority is sacred scripture. Mal's colleague Dr. Norman Geisler calls these two truths, inspiration and inerrancy, "epistemological fundamentals" which are "tests of evangelical veracity." Dr. Couch tenaciously held to the full, absolute, and errorless book known as the Holy Bible.

Coupling that truth of inspiration and inerrancy Mal embraced along with its subsequent application of a historical grammatical interpretation methodology (plain or literal interpretation), Mal understood that faith would naturally lead the saint towards the other great truths about sin, Christ, redemption, love, and grace. His loyalty to the Word revealed his loyalty to Christ Jesus. We cannot in one sentence claim to believe the Bible as truth and yet then interpret it in such a way that we undermine the very words used by God to convey his heart and mind to us. To do so reveals immaturity at the least and at most possibly hypocrisy.

Therefore, Dr. Couch taught that believers must not only base our belief on the Bible but they must also make sure to interpret that Bible with a proper hermeneutic, which for him has been the historical grammatical hermeneutic that he presented in his book "An Introduction to Classical Hermeneutics: A Guide to the History and Practice of Biblical Interpretation." Mal's colleague Dr. Norman Geisler calls this the "hermeneutical fundamentals" which is a "test for "evangelical consistency."

Couch also labored in love to show God's sovereignty in both creation and re-creation with his various lectures and teachings. Mal has shown not only God's work in the past with creation, the present in salvation and sanctification, but he has also faithfully pointed us to the future restoration where Christ will return to rule and reign as King. Throughout his numerous books he has edited or written, such as the "21st Century Biblical Commentary Series," "The New Covenant" and "My Eyes Shall See the King," along with "The Coming of the Holy Spirit" people can see the teachings about God's original creation, man's fall into sin, Christ's work of redemption, and the Holy Spirit's work in creating and empowering the body of Christ for the task of the Great Commission. As Mal stated in his own words, "The King and kingdom were rejected by the Jewish people. The kingdom would be postponed until some far—off future time. Meanwhile, a new dispensation, the Church, would begin" and the "disciples would then be sent forth, clothed with power from on high" so the "clear salvation message" could be "proclaimed 'to all the nations, beginning from Jerusalem.'"

In teaching about this body of Christ and Christ's future return for the Bride, his spiritual family, Dr. Couch wrote "A Biblical Ecclesiology." In that work Mal has laid a solid foundation for all of us to rest upon, as well as to build upon, for future church planting and reformational work of existing churches. This was a practical manual on the church. His book, "A Pastor's Manual on Doing Church" takes the doctrine of the church and fleshes it out in practical reality. Additionally Couch wrote and edited "A Bible Handbook to the Acts of the Apostles" so people can go back to Scripture and actually see the first hand principles and patterns of the first disciples of Christ.

Too, he labored diligently to warn people about current evils and threats to the family of Christ. Mal's love for people is harnessed around the value, sanctity, and importance of godly family life in both the physical and spiritual realms. His book "Issues 2000: Evangelical Faith & Cultural Trends in the New Millennium" sets forth a clarion call for people to be aware of ungodly philosophies, the dangers of technology, mysticism, and the social dangers that seek to damage the saint, the body of Christ, and individual families. He warned others often about secular (anti-biblical) psychology, materialism, mysticism, hedonism, evolution, feminism, existentialism, relativism, and Gnosticism as "the philosophies destroying Evangelical Churches."

Mal also labored with his partner in grace, Lacy Couch. Concurrently working with Mal in those ministry efforts he had a faithful and fruitful ministry with his beloved wife Dr. Lacy Couch. His efforts to seek to cure evils among the body of Christ were also complemented by the  efforts of his talented, intelligent, and spiritual wife, who extended the ministry further with her efforts in teaching and biblical counseling ministry to families.  Lacy taught with Mal in the seminary and she instilled some of the greatest truths for a healthy spiritual life in her students through her counseling courses. Her courses and lectures on family life, counseling, and other related biblical truths were refreshing and probably somewhat reminiscent of Priscilla in the NT era. In fact, Mal and Lacy's collective ministry serve to remind people of the value and importance of team ministry such as an Aquilla and Priscilla ministry and how a family unit ministry can be a strong antidote to the current evils that plague people today.

In fact, together Mal and Lacy seemed to model well the life of a biblical familial patriarchy that opposed not only gender feminism but also male chauvinism. They modeled for the students a pattern that we can imitate today. Mal and Lacy avoided the extremes of male chauvinists who claim women have no place or role in the work of Christian ministry. Yet too they also avoided the opposite extreme of matriarchy/gender-feminism that says women are to have absolute and/or independent rule over the body of Christ. They modeled something like what we read about in the pages of Scripture: a man and woman team ministry. Just as God called Adam and Eve to take dominion over the earth, Mal and Lacy worked collectively to take dominion over their local spheres of influence through their calling to minister as a team.

John F. Kennedy reporting
As a young man, Couch worked in television news. While at the Dallas Theological Seminary, Couch filmed stories for WFAA-TV in Dallas. It was there he was assigned to cover President Kennedy's fateful 1963 visit. Couch was in a media car that was part of the presidential motorcade. He and other reporters heard three shots fired as they proceeded along Houston Street toward the Texas School Book Depository. They looked up in time to see the barrel of a rifle being drawn back into a window in the Depository.

Listing of Degrees 

 B.A., John Brown University
 M.A., Wheaton College Graduate School
 Th.M., Dallas Theological Seminary
 Th.D., Louisiana Baptist University  
 D.D., North Tennessee Bible Institute
 D.R.S., Scofield Graduate School & Theological Seminary 
 Ph.D., Arkansas Biblical Graduate School

Books 
 The Gospel Of Luke: Christ, The Son Of Man. AMG Publishers  (2006)
 Theology: The God Of The Bible Kregel Publications (2005)  
 Inspiration and Inerrancy: God Has Spoken AMG Publishers   (2003)
 Blessed Hope: The Autobiography of John Walvoord, (co-author John F. Walvoord) AMG Publishers  (2001)
 The Hope of Christ's Return: Premillennial Commentary on 1 and 2 Thessalonians AMG Publishers   (2001)
 An Introduction to Classical Hemeneutics: A Guide to the History and Practice of Biblical Interpretation, (co-author Russell Penney) Kregel Publications   (2000)
 Dictionary of Premillennial Theology, Kregel Publications, 1997 
 So That's How We Got the Bible, with Bob Friedman Tyndale House Publishers   (1973)

References

1938 births
2013 deaths
Christian writers
John Brown University alumni
Louisiana Baptist University alumni
Wheaton College (Illinois) alumni
Witnesses to the assassination of John F. Kennedy